The secretary-general of the Chinese Communist Party was a senior leadership position of the Chinese Communist Party (CCP) to assist in the daily work of the Central Committee. The secretary-general was established at the beginning of the founding of the CCP. However, due to the loss of information during the Long March and the Chinese Civil War, the records of the early secretaries-general were incomplete. Deng Xiaoping, the second-generation leader of China, served three times in the early years as the secretary-general of the Central Committee. The position of the secretary-general was renamed as general secretary from 1956 to 1966 and from 1980 to 1982. At that time, the leader of the Communist Party was Chairman of the Central Committee. The general secretary assisted the party chairman and vice chairmen in handling works of the Secretariat. Deng Xiaoping and Hu Yaobang successively served as the secretary-general and general secretary during the period of Chairman Mao Zedong and Chairman Hua Guofeng respectively.

List of secretaries-general

See also 
 Chinese Communist Party Committee Secretary

References 

Chinese Communist Party politicians
China